Jodi Anne Hauptman (born October 20, 1964) is an American art historian and curator. Hauptman is the Senior Curator of Prints and Drawings at the Museum of Modern Art.

Career
Hauptman graduated from the Smithtown Central School District in 1982. She then earned a Bachelor of Arts from Princeton University in 1986, and later received a Master of Arts and a Doctor of Philosophy in Art History from Yale University in 1995. She wrote a doctoral dissertation on the artist Joseph Cornell.

In 2001, Hauptman received the Charles C. Eldredge Prize from the Smithsonian American Art Museum for her book on Cornell published two years earlier. A year later, she joined the Museum of Modern Art, and was promoted to Senior Curator of Prints and Drawings there in 2014. There, Hauptman has organized exhibitions on the artists Paul Cézanne, Edgar Degas, Fernand Léger, Henri Matisse, and Georges Seurat, while publishing on others such as Sonia Delaunay-Terk, Odilon Redon, Medardo Rosso, Léopold Survage, and Sophie Taeuber-Arp, in addition to Cornell.

See also
List of Princeton University alumni
List of Yale University people

References

External links
Museum of Modern Art profile

Living people
1964 births
21st-century American women
American art curators
American women curators
Women art historians
Yale University alumni
Princeton University alumni
People associated with the Museum of Modern Art (New York City)